The 1974–75 New York Knicks season was the 29th season for the team in the National Basketball Association (NBA). In the regular season, the Knicks had a 40–42 win–loss record, finishing in third place in the Atlantic Division and qualifying for the NBA Playoffs. New York lost to the Houston Rockets in the best-of-three first round of the playoffs, two games to one.

In the first round of the 1974 NBA draft, the Knicks did not select any players; their first pick was the 32nd overall choice in the second round, which they used to acquire Jesse Dark. The team alternated between wins and losses in their first eight games of the season, and were 6–6 before winning 11 of their next 13 games. They then lost six of the following seven contests, and by February 11 they fell below .500 for the season, at 27–28. New York remained with more losses than wins for the rest of the season, but still reached the postseason.

The Knicks were seeded fifth in the Eastern Conference and faced the fourth-seeded Rockets in the opening round of the playoffs. After a 15-point loss in Houston, the Knicks required a victory at home to extend their season, and defeated the Rockets 106–96 to force a decisive third game in the series. The Rockets won the final game, by a score of 118–86, to end New York's season.

Draft picks

Note: This is not an extensive list; it only covers the first and second rounds, and any other players picked by the franchise that played at least one game in the league.

Roster

Regular season

Season standings

Notes
y – division champions
x – clinched playoff spot

Record vs. opponents

Playoffs

|- align="center" bgcolor="#ffcccc"
| 1
| April 8
| @ Houston
| W 99–84
| Walt Frazier (21)
| Phil Jackson (13)
| Walt Frazier (11)
| Hofheinz Pavilion10,218
| 0–1
|- align="center" bgcolor="#ccffcc"
| 2
| April 10
| Houston
| L 96–106
| Walt Frazier (26)
| Phil Jackson (10)
| Harthorne Wingo (7)
| Madison Square Garden19,694
| 1–1
|- align="center" bgcolor="#ffcccc"
| 3
| April 12
| @ Houston
| W 118–86
| Walt Frazier (24)
| Harthorne Wingo (10)
| Walt Frazier (4)
| Hofheinz Pavilion10,218
| 1–2
|-

Awards and records
Walt Frazier, All-NBA First Team
Walt Frazier, NBA All-Defensive First Team

References

New York
New York Knicks seasons
New York Knicks
New York Knicks
1970s in Manhattan
Madison Square Garden